Harold "Harry" Thompson (September 9, 1889 – February 14, 1951) was a Major League Baseball pitcher who played in  with the Washington Senators and the Philadelphia Athletics.

External links

1889 births
1951 deaths
Major League Baseball pitchers
Baseball players from Pennsylvania
Washington Senators (1901–1960) players
Philadelphia Athletics players